Steve Buckley may refer to:

 Steve Buckley (footballer) (born 1953), English footballer
 Steve Buckley (journalist) (born 1956), Irish American journalist
 Steve Buckley (musician), British jazz musician
 Steve Buckley (soccer) (born 1950), American soccer player